Oleksandr Ivanovych Muzychko (Ukrainian: Олександр Іванович Музичко, 19 September 1962 – 24 March 2014), nicknamed Sashko Bilyi (Alex White), was a Ukrainian political activist, a member of UNA-UNSO and coordinator of Right Sector in Western Ukraine.

Muzychko had vowed to fight "communists, Jews and Russians for as long as blood flows in my veins."

Biography
Muzychko was born near the Ural Mountains to a Ukrainian father and a Belarusian mother, both deported members of the Ukrainian Insurgent Army.

During the First Chechen War he led the UNA-UNSO "Viking" group. In 1995, Muzychko was convicted of causing grievous bodily harm to an individual. In 1997, he was accused of attempting to kill a member of UNA-UNSO in Kiev. In 1999, Muzychko was sentenced to 3 years in prison for racketeering and kidnapping. In 2009, he was accused in a hostile corporate raid. In 2012, he ran for the Ukrainian parliament in the 153rd electoral district (Rivne) coming sixth.

On 27 February 2014, Muzychko attacked the Prosecutor of the Rivne Oblast in his office and threatened to "slay as a dog" the Minister of Internal Affairs Arsen Avakov. On 28 February 2014, criminal proceedings were opened against him.

On 7 March 2014, ITAR-TASS reported that he was wanted by Russian authorities for war atrocities. On 11 March 2014, Russian State Duma opposition leader Valery Rashkin urged Russian special services to "follow Mossad examples" and assassinate Right Sector leaders Dmytro Yarosh and Muzychko.

Death
On 24 March 2014, Oleksandr Muzychko was shot dead. There are conflicting stories about how this happened. An official inquiry concluded he had shot himself twice at the end of a police chase, one bullet scratching his skin and the other into the heart (this one proved to be fatal).

According to Ukrainian MP Oles Doniy, a group of unknown armed people arrived in three Volkswagen minivans and kidnapped Muzychko and five other people from a café near Rivne. They murdered Muzychko behind the café with two gunshots to the heart. In another telling of Doniy's account, a group of attackers forced Muzychko to halt his car, pulled him out of the vehicle, handcuffed him and shot him.

According to the interior ministry of Ukraine, Muzychko died in a shoot-out with police in a café in Rivne.  According to the ministry, the police raided the café to arrest Muzychko, but he opened fire while he tried to flee.  He was shot when the police returned fire.  The police were able to capture him and three others, but by the time the paramedics had arrived at the scene, he had died.

On 25 March, police stated that Muzychko had shot himself. This was confirmed by an inquiry by the interior ministry, who concluded he had shot himself in the heart as police tried to bring him to the ground after a chase. The inquiry also concluded he had fired previously, resulting in a scratch on his skin, and that the police had acted lawfully.

Reacting to the news about the shooting, Dmytro Yarosh, leader of Right Sector, called for resignation of Interior Minister Arsen Avakov and the arrest of the police officers who came after Muzychko. Unknown member of the Right Sector promised to reprisal to the minister for his death.

10 days before his death Alexander Muzychko accused Ukrainian police (MIA) and general prosecutor offices of making preparation for his assassination. According to Volodymyr Yevdokymov, a former officer of the SSU, Muzychko  was "neutralised" during special operation of the SSU.

Legacy
In Konotop, a street was named after Oleksandr Muzychko.

References

External links
 Biography
 Radio Free Europe/Radio Liberty: Muzychko on Ukrainian-Russian relations (MPEG video)
 Muzychko displays weapons while speaking to legislators

1962 births
2014 deaths
Deaths by firearm in Ukraine
Far-right politics in Ukraine
People from Kizel
People of the Chechen wars
People of the Euromaidan
Prisoners and detainees of Ukraine
Soviet military personnel of the Soviet–Afghan War
Chechen field commanders
Ukrainian criminals
Ukrainian gangsters
Ukrainian nationalists
Ukrainian prisoners and detainees